Over to William was an ITV sitcom which aired in 1956. It was a live TV adaptation of the Just William short stories. It was produced by Associated Television (ATV) and starred Keith Crane, Michael Saunders, John Symonds, and Meurig Wyn-Jones. All 13 episodes are missing, believed lost.

References

External links

1956 British television series debuts
1956 British television series endings
Lost television shows
English-language television shows
ITV sitcoms
1950s British sitcoms
Television shows produced by Associated Television (ATV)
Just William